The St. Louis Scott Gallagher Soccer Club (SLSG) is a sports club dedicated to the development and advancement of all levels of soccer in the St. Louis metropolitan area of Missouri and Illinois. 

The result of the 2007 merger of three of the area's leading soccer clubs (St. Louis/Busch Soccer Club, Scott Gallagher Soccer Club, and Metro United Soccer Club), SLSG sponsors 275 teams for boys and girls in age groups from under-6 through under-20, including U.S. Soccer Development Academy programs. 

In addition to teams and leagues, the organization sponsors such activities as training camps, specialized physical training, manager/coach training, and nine seasonal tournaments for boys and girls age group teams from throughout the U.S. and Canada.                                      

SLSG is headquartered at World Wide Technology Soccer Park in Fenton, Missouri. The organization also has facilities in Creve Coeur and Cottleville, Missouri and Collinsville, Illinois.

A unit of the organization, SLSG Pro LLC, owned and operated Saint Louis FC, a team in the USL Championship that played home matches in the 5,500 seat Toyota Stadium at World Wide Technology Soccer Park. After six seasons (2015-2020), Saint Louis FC disbanded after the 2020 season because of COVID-19 concerns and to make way for Saint Louis City SC of Major League Soccer.

Starting in 2021 the club fielded a team in USL League Two which finished 3rd in the Heartland division with a 6-4-2 record and did not qualify for the playoffs.

US men's national team player Josh Sargent played for their youth program from 2008 to 2016, including playing for the U17 national team and winning the 2016 Nike International Friendlies, which got him a transfer to IMG Academy Bradenton and his MLS rights were acquired by Sporting Kansas City.

Year-by-year

Notable graduates
Names in bold have represented their national teams.
  Aedan Stanley
  Ko Ise
  Tim Ream
  Will Bruin
  A. J. Cochran
  Chad Vandegriffe
  Emir Alihodžić
  Tomás Gómez
  Seth Rudolph
  Austin Ledbetter
  Wan Kuzain
  Brian Bement
  Josh Sargent
  Jack Maher
  Jake Leeker
  Aris Nukić
  Austin Panchot
  Nichi Vlastos
  Sarah Luebbert
  Logan Panchot

References

External links
 St. Louis Scott Gallagher
 Saint Louis FC

Scott Gallagher
Soccer in Missouri
2007 establishments in Missouri
Sports clubs in the United States
USL League Two teams
Youth soccer in the United States